Phil McClellan McNagny Jr. (July 16, 1924 – March 28, 1981) was a United States district judge of the United States District Court for the Northern District of Indiana.

Education and career

Born in Fort Wayne, Indiana, McNagny was in the United States Marine Corps during World War II, from 1943 to 1945. He received a Bachelor of Laws from Indiana University Maurer School of Law in 1950. He was in private practice in Angola, Indiana in 1950, and then in Columbia City, Indiana until 1976, interrupted by his service as the United States Attorney for the Northern District of Indiana, from 1953 to 1959.

Federal judicial service

On June 24, 1975, McNagny was nominated by President Gerald Ford to a seat on the United States District Court for the Northern District of Indiana vacated by Judge George N. Beamer. McNagny was confirmed by the United States Senate on May 6, 1976, and received his commission on May 7, 1976. McNagny served in that capacity until his death, on March 28, 1981, after a long illness.

References

Sources
 

1924 births
1981 deaths
United States Attorneys for the Northern District of Indiana
Judges of the United States District Court for the Northern District of Indiana
United States district court judges appointed by Gerald Ford
20th-century American judges
United States Marine Corps personnel of World War II
People from Fort Wayne, Indiana
People from Angola, Indiana
People from Columbia City, Indiana
Military personnel from Indiana